First Presbyterian Church is a historic Presbyterian church building at 215 Fifth Avenue South in Lewistown, Montana.

It was built in 1912 and added to the National Register of Historic Places in 1986.

It was deemed "a fine example" of the "stone masonry building tradition that characterizes the early architecture of Lewistown."

References

Presbyterian churches in Montana
Churches on the National Register of Historic Places in Montana
Churches completed in 1912
1912 establishments in Montana
National Register of Historic Places in Fergus County, Montana